La Linea (Italian) or La Línea (Spanish, "the line") may refer to:

 La Línea corruption case, Guatemalan corruption case revolving around the former president and vice-president.
 La Línea de la Concepción, a town in Spain bordering Gibraltar
 La Línea (Road Pass), high mountain pass and planned highway tunnel in Colombia
 La Línea (gang), a group of gunmen working for the Mexican Juárez Cartel

Entertainment
 La línea, Spanish language album by Lila Downs.
 La Línea original proposed title of The Line (2009 film), a US action crime thriller set in Mexico with Ray Liotta and Armand Asante 
 La Linea (TV series), a series of animated shorts from Italy

See also
Lineae lines on moons of Jupiter and other objects